"Change (In the House of Flies)", often referred to as "Change", is a song by American alternative metal band Deftones, released as the first single from their third album, White Pony, on May 16, 2000. It remains their most commercially successful single to date, peaking at No. 3 in Billboards Alternative Songs chart, No. 9 in the Mainstream Rock Tracks chart and No. 53 in the UK Singles Chart. The song was featured on the MuchMusic compilation album Big Shiny Tunes 5. The song is described as nu metal, alternative metal, alternative rock and  hard rock.

Music video

The music video, directed by Liz Friedlander, features the band playing at a party. The people attending have apathetic looks and wear animal masks. The video was shot at a Hollywood, California estate in May.<ref name="Making the video">[https://www.youtube.com/watch?v=rPX65VZg_SM Making the video "Change" - Behind the Scenes]</ref>

As of March 2021, the song has 20 million views on YouTube.

Legacy
In 2012, Loudwire ranked the song number one on their list of the 10 greatest Deftones songs, and in 2020, Kerrang ranked the song number two on their list of the 20 greatest Deftones songs.

Track listing

Other versions
An acoustic version appeared on the MTV The Return of the Rock, Vol. 2 compilation, and was also included on the band's B-Sides & Rarities album.

Notable covers
British metalcore band Architects covered the song on their 2019 EP Spotify Singles.

 Charts 

In popular culture
The song has been featured in a number of films and television series, including:
 Little Nicky (2000).
 Queen of the Damned (2002).
 Dragon Ball Z: Cooler's Revenge (U.S. Funimation English dub) (2002).
 American Horror Story: Red Tide'' (2021).

References

2000 singles
2000 songs
Deftones songs
Music videos directed by Liz Friedlander
Maverick Records singles
Song recordings produced by Terry Date
Songs written by Stephen Carpenter
Songs written by Chi Cheng (musician)
Songs written by Abe Cunningham
Songs written by Chino Moreno
American alternative rock songs